Melaleuca lutea is a plant in the myrtle family, Myrtaceae and is endemic to Western Australia. This species was previously known as Melaleuca citrina but was renamed to allow Callistemon citrinus to be moved to the genus Melaleuca. It is distinguished by its oval shaped, dense heads of yellow flowers and bushy foliage.

Description

The bright yellow flowers are arranged in oval-shaped spikes, often on the ends of branches which continue to grow after flowering. The stamens are in five bundles around the flower, each bundle with 5 to 9 stamens.

Taxonomy and naming
Melaleuca lutea was previously known as Melaleuca citrina, first described in 1852 by Nikolai Turczaninow in Bulletin de la classe physico-mathematique de l'Academie Imperiale des sciences de Saint-Petersburg.

In 2006, Lyndley Craven proposed that all callistemons be moved to the genus Melaleuca. The move meant that Callistemon citrinus would become Melaleuca citrina. That name was already in use (a homonym). As a result, the name of the former Melaleuca citrina was changed to Melaleuca lutea.

The specific epithet is a Latin word meaning "yellow" referring to the flower colour of this melaleuca.

Distribution and habitat
This melaleuca occurs in heath and shrub from the Porongurup and Stirling Range National Parks to the Hopetoun district in the Esperance Plains biogeographic region. It grows in sandy soils on rocky hills.

Conservation status
Melaleuca lutea is listed as "not threatened" by the Government of Western Australia Department of Parks and Wildlife.

Use in horticulture
Melaleuca lutea is well known in cultivation (usually as Melaleuca citrina) in Western Australia, growing in a range of soil types.

References

lutea
Myrtales of Australia
Plants described in 2010
Endemic flora of Western Australia
Taxa named by Lyndley Craven